The history of Derby County Football Club is described in detail in two separate articles:

 History of Derby County F.C. (1884–1967)
 History of Derby County F.C. (1967–present)